The Early Middle Years is the second studio album by Tone Dogs, released in 1991 by Soleilmoon Recordings. In reviewing the album for Option, critic Mark Sullivan said, "The Tone Dogs play art-rock with a hard edge, their experimental streak appears in surreal lyrics, odd meters, unusual instrumentation (two basses and drums on some tracks), and eclecticism."

Track listing

Personnel 
Adapted from The Early Middle Years liner notes.

Tone Dogs
Fred Chalenor – bass guitar, electric guitar
Amy Denio – vocals, alto saxophone, electric guitar, bass guitar
Will Dowd – drums, backing vocals

Production and additional personnel
Drew Canulette – producer, recording, mixing
John Donald – mixing (14)
John Golden – mastering
Lance Limbocker – mixing (14)
Mike Todd – mixing (14)
Tone Dogs – producer

Release history

References 

1991 albums
Tone Dogs albums